Bhandgran is a small town in southwest Kotla Arab Ali Khan, Pakistan, 5 km from that hamlet's center. It consists of about 400 homes, with a population of about 6,000. mughal mirza

The village is served by three schools and seven mosques.

Populated places in Gujrat District